Kochi State assembly constituency is one of the 140 state legislative assembly constituencies in Kerala state in southern India.  It is also one of the 7 state legislative assembly constituencies included in the Ernakulam Lok Sabha constituency. As of the 2016 assembly elections, the current MLA is Maxi of CPI(M).

Local self governed segments
Kochi Niyama Sabha constituency is composed of the following 20 wards of the Kochi Municipal Corporation (Fort Kochi zone and Mattancherry zone), and 2 Gram Panchayats in Kochi Taluk:

All of the above 20 wards are included in Kochi Taluk

Members of Legislative Assembly
The following list contains all members of Kerala legislative assembly who have represented Kochi Niyamasabha Constituency during the period of various assemblies:

Key

Election results
Percentage change (±%) denotes the change in the number of votes from the immediate previous election.

Niyamasabha Election 2021
There were 	1,81,842 registered voters in the constituency for the 2021 election.

Niyamasabha Election 2016
There were 	1,71,356 registered voters in the constituency for the 2016 election.

Niyamasabha Election 2011 
There were 1,58,548 registered voters in the constituency for the 2011 election.

See also
 Kochi
 Ernakulam district
 List of constituencies of the Kerala Legislative Assembly
 2016 Kerala Legislative Assembly election
 2019 Kerala Legislative Assembly by-elections

References 

Assembly constituencies of Kerala

State assembly constituencies in Ernakulam district